Rajanaka: Mantra is an album by Brad Roberts, which consists of various mantras, accompanied to music.  The album was released for purchase via online download.

Track listing
"Shiva Bija"
"Om Namo Ganapataye"
"By Any & All Means"
"Between the Reeds"
"The Wonderful Destroyer"
"La Litra"
"Invocation"
"Twisted Trunk"

Download Sites
Rajanaka-Mantra.com

External links
Rajanaka: Mantra at VRTCL Entertainment

New-age albums
2011 albums